Sierra Maestra is a Cuban newspaper. It is published in Spanish, with an online English edition.
The newspaper is located in Santiago de Cuba.

External links 
 Sierra Maestra Digital 
 Sierra Maestra Digital 

Newspapers published in Cuba
Publications with year of establishment missing
Mass media in Santiago de Cuba